Thomas Bachlechner (born 13 October, 1980) is an Italian football player, the son of Klaus Bachlechner. He currently plays for F.C. Canavese. He has played for the team of his hometown Bruneck, F.C. Südtirol and Ivrea.

References

External links
Player profile at FootballPlus.com

1980 births
Living people
Footballers from Verona
Italian footballers
Germanophone Italian people
A.S.D. Calcio Ivrea players
Association football forwards
Footballers from Trentino-Alto Adige/Südtirol